The Ballad of Angel's Alley: A Pocket Opera is an Australian musical set in Melbourne's "push" wars of the 1890s, with book and lyrics by Jeff Underhill and music by Bruce George.

First seen at Melbourne's New Theatre in 1958, The Ballad of Angel's Alley received a professional premiere in July 1962 at the Russell St Theatre in Melbourne presented by the Union Theatre Repertory Company, featuring Kevin Colson, Mary Hardy, Reg Livermore, Marion Edward and Bob Hornery.

It was also performed by NIDA students at Sydney's Old Tote Theatre in September 1963, and was revived professionally by Melbourne's St Martin's Theatre in April 1973.

Reviewing the 1962 Melbourne production, The Bulletin said it was "a loud, fast and funny musical" and "a brilliant success - at least as good as the average imported musical, and the best thing of local origin we have seen for years".

The script was published by Yackandandah Playscripts in 1989.

References 

Australian musicals
1958 musicals